Ryan Tierney (born 30 January 1998) is a Scottish professional footballer who plays as a striker for Stenhousemuir.

Career
Tierney began his career with Airdrie, joining Hamilton Academical in 2011, turning professional in July 2014.

On 18 August 2017, Tierney and Hamilton teammate Jordan McGregor signed for Airdrieonians on a development loan until January 2018. He returned to Accies on 3 January 2018. After leaving Hamilton he spent time with Edusport Academy before joining Scottish League One side Dumbarton in the summer of 2019 scoring the winner on his debut, in a 1-0 success against Annan Athletic. After 20 appearances and two goals for the club, he left in the summer of 2020 after a single season.

BSC Glasgow announced the signing of Tierney on 31 July 2020. He then moved to Stenhousemuir in 2021.

Career statistics

References

1998 births
Living people
Scottish footballers
Airdrieonians F.C. players
Hamilton Academical F.C. players
Scottish Professional Football League players
Association football forwards
Caledonian Braves F.C. players
Dumbarton F.C. players
Broomhill F.C. (Scotland) players
Stenhousemuir F.C. players
Lowland Football League players